FC Nerds is a reality television sports franchise developed by Nordisk Film.

Incarnations
Denmark: FC Zulu
Sweden: FC Z
Norway: Tufte IL and FK Zebra
Finland: FC Nörtit
Netherlands: Atletico Ananas
Germany: Borussia Banana
Australia: Nerds FC
Spain: Paketes FC
Iceland: Knattspyrnufélagið Nörd
Hungary: Lúzer FC
Belgium (Flanders): FC Nerds

Reality television series franchises